The 2014 Buffalo Bills season was the franchise's 45th season in the National Football League, 55th season of competition, second under head coach Doug Marrone and the first in franchise history without Ralph Wilson as owner. The Bills defense continued its strong play from last season, finishing first in the league with 54 quarterback sacks. Overall, the Bills improved on their 6–10 record from 2013, finishing with a 9–7 record, their first winning season since 2004, yet they still missed the playoffs after a Week 16 loss to the Oakland Raiders.

Background

Death of Ralph Wilson and sale to Terrence Pegula
Ralph Wilson, the founding owner of the Buffalo Bills, died at the age of 95 on March 25, 2014. In his will, Wilson placed the team into a trust governed by his wife, niece and two team officials, who were separately given instructions to sell the team in short order, not only to the highest bidder, but with a precondition that the team be kept in Buffalo. Three bidders stepped forward with bids: stalking horse bidder Donald Trump, the family of Buffalo Sabres owner and natural gas baron Terrence Pegula and a consortium led by musician Jon Bon Jovi and the principals of Maple Leaf Sports & Entertainment, the last of whom raised serious concerns that the team would relocate to Toronto at the first opportunity. The Pegula family was named as the winning bidder on September 9 and closed on its purchase of the team on October 8.

Cancellation of the Toronto Series
On March 5, 2014, three weeks before Wilson's death, the Bills announced the postponement of the Bills Toronto Series for one year. Bills President and CEO Russ Brandon will evaluate the series in the future, possibly to permanently cancel games in Toronto. On December 3, 2014, after six years and a 1–5 record (their only win coming in a 23–0 shutout victory against the Washington Redskins), the Bills Toronto Series was permanently cancelled.

On-field
The Bills won their first two games, a 23–20 overtime road win at Chicago (their first-ever victory at Soldier Field) and an emotionally raucous 29–10 home win against division rival Miami, a game played just days after the announcement that the Pegulas would purchase the team and keep it in Buffalo. But Buffalo lost their next two, a 22–10 loss at home against San Diego and a 23–17 loss on the road at Houston, after which Marrone benched quarterback EJ Manuel (their first round pick the previous year) in favor of journeyman Kyle Orton. In his first start as a Bill against Detroit at Ford Field, Orton threw for 308 yards as Buffalo came back from a 14-0 halftime deficit to defeat Detroit 17–14 in then-defensive coordinator Jim Schwartz's first return to Detroit since being fired in the offseason, following an eventual game-winning 58-yard field goal by kicker Dan Carpenter.

Buffalo would lose its next game, a 37–22 loss at home against New England before coming back from a 16–10 deficit against Minnesota to win 17-16 after Orton threw for 283 yards, two touchdowns, the second of which to rookie wide receiver Sammy Watkins and connecting with tight end Scott Chandler for 18 yards to convert a 3rd-and-12 and 24 yards to convert a 4th-and-20, respectively (Orton also had an interception and a lost fumble, one of three for the Bills offense). Unfortunately for Buffalo, running backs C. J. Spiller and Fred Jackson were both injured in the first half. With running back Bryce Brown, who the Bills traded their conditional fourth-rounder that can become a third-round selection (that they had acquired in the trade that sent Stevie Johnson to San Francisco) to Philadelphia, inactive for the game and no time to find anyone to help carry the ball, running back Anthony Dixon, who the Bills signed as a free agent from San Francisco was left to carry the ball himself, with fullback Frank Summers assisting.

On November 30, the Bills beat the Cleveland Browns giving them their seventh win, which not only improved on the previous season, in which they finished 6-10 for the third time since 2003 (they finished 6–10 in 2009 and 2011, the latter of which after they started 5–2), but it also gives them their best start entering December since the 2000 Buffalo Bills season, in which they finished 8-8 and missed the playoffs. With a win against the Green Bay Packers on December 14, the Bills broke a league-leading streak of nine consecutive losing seasons dating back to 2005; however, the next week's 26–24 loss to the Oakland Raiders eliminated them from playoff contention for the 15th consecutive year, continuing a league-leading drought. The team finished with a 17–9 win against the New England Patriots, who were resting the starters in preparation for a playoff run; the win was the first time the team had won at Gillette Stadium (they had lost all 12 previous attempts) and established the team's first winning season since 2004 (former head coach Mike Mularkey's first season).

Roster changes

Free agents lost

Signings

2014 draft

Draft trades
 The Bills traded their original first-round selection (No. 9 overall) and their 2015 first- and fourth-round selections to the Cleveland Browns in exchange for the Browns' first-round selection (No. 4 overall).
 The Bills traded their original second-round selection (No. 41 overall) to the St. Louis Rams in exchange for the Rams' second- and fifth-round selections (Nos. 44 and 153 overall, respectively).
 The Bills traded their original fifth-round selection (No. 149 overall) to the Tampa Bay Buccaneers in exchange for the Buccaneers' seventh-round selection (No. 221 overall) and a 2015 fifth-round selection.
 The Bills traded their sixth-round selection (No. 185 overall) to the Tampa Bay Buccaneers in exchange for wide receiver Mike Williams.
 The Bills traded their original seventh-round selection (No. 224 overall) to the Philadelphia Eagles in exchange running back Bryce Brown and the Eagles' seventh-round selection (No. 237 overall). The trade also includes a conditional future draft selection, which the Eagles could receive from the Bills in either 2015 or 2016. If Brown hits undisclosed statistical rushing targets in 2014, the Eagles will receive the Bills' 2016 third-round selection, otherwise, the Eagles could receive the Bills' 2015 fourth-round selection, which the Bills conditionally acquired in a trade that sent wide receiver Stevie Johnson to the San Francisco 49ers. However, if Johnson does not meet certain statistical receiving targets with the 49ers in 2014, the trade with the 49ers will be voided, and if Brown does not meet certain statistical rushing targets with the Bills in 2014, the Bills will not have to send a future selection to the Eagles.

Staff

Final roster

Schedule

Preseason
On February 27, 2014, the NFL announced that, to celebrate the induction of wide receiver Andre Reed, the Bills would play the New York Giants in the Pro Football Hall of Fame Game in Canton, Ohio, which took place on August 3, 2014, and aired on NBC. The remainder of the Bills' preseason opponents were announced on April 9, 2014.

Regular season

Notes
 Intra-division opponents are in bold text.
 For the first time since 2007, the Bills did not play a game in Toronto, as the Bills Toronto Series was suspended in March 2014 and permanently canceled later that year.

Game summaries

Week 1: at Chicago Bears

Week 2: vs. Miami Dolphins

Week 3: vs. San Diego Chargers

Week 4: at Houston Texans

Week 5: at Detroit Lions

Week 6: vs. New England Patriots

Week 7: vs. Minnesota Vikings

Week 8: at New York Jets

Week 10: vs. Kansas City Chiefs

Week 11: at Miami Dolphins

Week 12: vs. New York Jets

Week 13: vs. Cleveland Browns

This was the 1st time the Bills have had a winning record this late in the season since 2008

Week 14: at Denver Broncos

Week 15: vs. Green Bay Packers

The Bills were the only AFC East team to defeat all of their NFC North opponents. The Bills also improved their record to 6–0 against the Packers at home.

Week 16: at Oakland Raiders

This loss eliminated Buffalo from playoff contention.

Week 17: at New England Patriots

This was the first time Buffalo won in New England since November 5, 2000.

Standings

Division

Conference

Fist bump controversy
After a touchdown by Denver Broncos' running back C. J. Anderson during the December 7 game, two officials acknowledged the call through the use of a fist bump. The move was seen by many Bills fans and players, including defensive back Aaron Williams, as an insensitive gesture, with some likening the gesture to a conspiracy. However, the NFL responded saying the gesture was "an acknowledgment of good mechanics between the two officials involved in making the call."

Notes

References

External links
 

Buffalo
Buffalo Bills seasons
Buffalo Bills